Cinecanal is a Latin American pan-regional cable television channel launched on April 1, 1993. It is owned by a group of Hollywood studios and Latin American cable companies. It is owned by the Fox Networks Group, a subsidiary of Disney International Operations, which is itself a subsidiary of The Walt Disney Company.

History 
The channel is dedicated to films. It began on 1 April 1993.

On November 27, 2020, Disney announced that it would rename the Fox channels in Latin America to Star on 22 February 2021. This change will not affect FX, National Geographic, FXM, Cinecanal or Fox Sports Channels.

In early April 2022, Cinecanal was launched in Brazil, as a replacement for Star Life, which shut down across the region.

References

Movie channels
Latin American cable television networks
Spanish-language television stations
The Walt Disney Company Latin America